The Kooka is a thin tailed sheep found in Pakistan and India.

Kooka have a white body coat and a black face. They have a compact body and produce an average of one liter of milk each day.

References 

Sheep breeds
Sheep breeds originating in Pakistan
Sheep breeds originating in India